Peschanokopskoye is a rural locality (a selo) and the administrative center of Peschanokopsky District in Rostov Oblast, Russia. Population:

References

Rural localities in Rostov Oblast